Characiella is a genus of green algae in the family Characiaceae.

References

External links

Sphaeropleales genera
Sphaeropleales